The 2003 America East men's basketball tournament was hosted by the Boston University Terriers at Walter Brown Arena. The final was held at Case Gym on the campus of Boston University. Vermont gained its first ever America East Championship and an automatic berth to the NCAA tournament with its win over Boston University. Vermont was given the 16th seed in the West Regional of the NCAA Tournament and lost in the first round to Arizona 80–51. Boston University gained a bid to the NIT and lost in the first round to St. John's 73–57.

Bracket and Results

See also
America East Conference

References

Sources

America East Conference men's basketball tournament
2002–03 America East Conference men's basketball season